The Connecticut Huskies baseball teams represented the University of Connecticut in Storrs, Connecticut, United States in college baseball at the NCAA Division I level.

1990

Personnel

Roster

Coaches

Schedule

1991

Personnel

Roster

Coaches

Schedule

1992

Personnel

Roster

Coaches

Schedule

1993

Personnel

Roster

Coaches

Schedule

1994

Personnel

Roster

Coaches

Schedule

1995

Personnel

Roster

Coaches

Schedule

1996

Personnel

Roster

Coaches

Schedule

1997

Personnel

Roster

Coaches

Schedule

1998

Personnel

Roster

Coaches

Schedule

1999

Personnel

Roster

Coaches

Schedule

References

UConn Huskies baseball seasons